Rajeev Ram and Bobby Reynolds were the defending champions but Reynolds decided not to participate.
Ram played alongside Travis Parrott, losing in the semifinals.
John Peers and John-Patrick Smith won the title, defeating César Ramírez and Bruno Rodríguez 6–3, 6–3 in the final.

Seeds

Draw

Draw

References
 Main Draw

Torneo Internacional AGT - Doubles
2012 Doubles